Anup Lal Yadav (5 October 1923 – 9 August 2013) was an Indian politician. He was MP for Saharsa and Bihar MLA for Triveniganj. He died in August 2013.

References

1923 births
2013 deaths
Leaders of the Opposition in the Bihar Legislative Assembly
State cabinet ministers of Bihar
India MPs 1998–1999
Lok Sabha members from Bihar
People from Supaul district
Janata Dal politicians
Rashtriya Janata Dal politicians
Janata Party politicians
Members of the Bihar Legislative Assembly
Samyukta Socialist Party politicians
Lok Dal politicians